Kosi-Seemanchal is a subregion of Mithila region in the Northeastern part of Bihar. It consists of Kosi and Purnia divisions. It has seven districts — Araria, Madhepura, Saharsa, Supaul, Purnea, Kishanganj and Katihar.

References

Mithila